Daisy Kaitano (born 20 September 1993) is a Zimbabwean footballer. She represented Zimbabwe in the football competition at the 2016 Summer Olympics.

References

Zimbabwean women's footballers
1993 births
Living people
Footballers at the 2016 Summer Olympics
Olympic footballers of Zimbabwe
Zimbabwe women's international footballers
Women's association football midfielders